Fotosearch is a stock photography company, founded in 1998. The company sells royalty-free and rights-managed photography, illustrations, video footage, clipart, and audio clips. Today, with digital images from over 140 publishers, it is one of the world's largest distributors of stock photography.

The core feature of the site is its search feature which allows users to access its database of over 15 million images.

The site is offered in more than a dozen languages with fully functional search, and the ability to pay in local currency for each site.  24-hour customer support by phone was added in 2005 and is also available for most languages.

Images distributed by Fotosearch have been featured in People magazine, The New York Times, and on the February 6, 2006, cover of Newsweek. Stock footage from Fotosearch has been used in several movies and was used in the April 19, 2005 PBS episode of NOVA scienceNOW.

The company is located in Waukesha, Wisconsin.

History

Fotosearch grew out of Publishing Perfection, founded in 1987, when electronic publishing was in its infancy. From the beginning the company targeted graphics and multimedia professionals through its monthly catalogue. The company specialized in providing the assistance required for buying graphics tools such as laser printers and image scanners. In addition to hardware and software the company began to offer high quality stock images in the early 1990s.

In 1996, Publishing Perfection launched a website offering an online catalogue, expanded product information and special discounts. In 1998, the company introduced the Fotosearch website where customers could search multiple stock photography publishers at a single site.

See also
 Stock photography

References

External links
 Fotosearch.com
 Publishingperfection.com

Stock photography
Photography companies of the United States